P50, P-50, or P.50 may refer to:

Aircraft 
 Grumman XP-50, an American twin-engine heavy fighter prototype of 1941
 Percival P.50 Prince, a late 1940s British light transport aircraft
 Piaggio P.50, an Italian heavy bomber prototype of 1937-1938
 Pottier P.50, a French racing aircraft developed in the late 1970s
 PZL.50 Jastrząb, a Polish fighter of the late 1930s

Automobiles 
 Honda P50, a Japanese moped
 Peel P50, a Manx three-wheeled microcar
 Trabant P 50, an East German small car

Mathematics and science 
 P50 (neuroscience), an auditory event-related potential recorded using EEG
 P50 (pressure), the partial pressure of a gas required to achieve 50% enzyme saturation
 ASCC1, activating signal cointegrator 1 complex subunit 1
 Median, or fiftieth percentile

Other uses 
 Huawei P50, a smartphone
 , a patrol vessel of the Indian Navy
 Kel-Tec P50, a semi-automatic pistol
 Papyrus 50, a New Testament manuscript
 Pauza P-50, a sniper rifle
 P50, a state regional road in Latvia